Cricetibacter is a genus of bacteria from the family of Pasteurellaceae with one known species (Cricetibacter osteomyelitidis). Cricetibacter osteomyelitidis has been isolated from a European hamster (Cricetus cricetus) with osteomyelitis.

References

Further reading 
 

Pasteurellales
Bacteria genera
Monotypic bacteria genera